Nesbitt is an unincorporated community in Harrison County, Texas, United States. Nesbitt's town government was disestablished on January 1, 2000, but it was still listed as a town at the 2010 census, with a population of 281.

Geography
Nesbitt is located in central Harrison County at  (32.590793, -94.444841).

Demographics
As of the census of 2000, there were 302 people, 115 households, and 83 families residing in the town. The population density was 172.8 people per square mile (66.6/km2). There were 131 housing units at an average density of 75.0/sq mi (28.9/km2). The racial makeup of the town was 80.46% White, 18.21% African American, 0.99% Native American, and 0.33% from two or more races.

There were 115 households, out of which 31.3% had children under the age of 18 living with them, 59.1% were married couples living together, 9.6% had a female householder with no husband present, and 27.8% were non-families. 27.0% of all households were made up of individuals, and 13.0% had someone living alone who was 65 years of age or older. The average household size was 2.63 and the average family size was 3.20.

In the town the population was spread out, with 27.2% under the age of 18, 9.3% from 18 to 24, 25.5% from 25 to 44, 23.5% from 45 to 64, and 14.6% who were 65 years of age or older. The median age was 38 years. For every 100 females, there were 102.7 males. For every 100 females age 18 and over, there were 100.0 males.

The median income for a household in the town was $29,583, and the median income for a family was $50,833. Males had a median income of $43,750 versus $23,000 for females. The per capita income for the town was $16,632. About 6.3% of families and 10.0% of the population were below the poverty line, including 14.9% of those under the age of eighteen and 10.0% of those 65 or over.

Fire Service
Nesbitt is served by Hasrrison County ESD#2 Nesbitt Fire Department. Nesbitt is an all volunteer department led by Chief Gary Smith and has three station locations. The Nesbitt Fire Department also serves the community by hosting local elections, National Night Out, and community events such as Cub Scout Awards Banquets. Department meetings are held on the 2nd and 4th Thursday of the month at 7:00pm at Station #3 (9091 HWY 154, Marshall, TX, 75670).  See the department website https://www.nesbittfiredepartment.com/ for more information.

Education
Nesbitt is served by the Marshall Independent School District.

References

Unincorporated communities in Harrison County, Texas
Unincorporated communities in Texas
Former cities in Texas
Populated places disestablished in 2000